Pedro Luis Leal Valencia (born 31 January 1989 in Puntarenas) is a Costa Rican football player, currently playing for Puntarenas. He plays as a defender.

Club career
Leal started his career at hometown club Puntarenas.

FK Senica
In September 2011, he joined Slovak club FK Senica on one-year loan from Puntarenas. He made his debut for Senica against Ružomberok on 9 September 2011. In summer 2012 he returned to Puntarenas.

In January 2014 Leal joined Deportiva Carmelita.

Ahead of the 2019-20 season, Leal returned to his hometown club Puntarenas.

International career
Leal played in the 2009 FIFA U-20 World Cup held in Egypt.

He made his debut for Costa Rica in a January 2011 Copa Centroamericana match against Guatemala and has, as of May 2014, earned a total of 11 caps, scoring no goals. He represented his country in 1 FIFA World Cup qualification match and played at the 2011 Copa Centroamericana and the 2011 Copa América.

References

External links
 
 
 

1989 births
Living people
People from Puntarenas
Association football defenders
Costa Rican footballers
Costa Rican expatriate footballers
Costa Rica international footballers
Costa Rica youth international footballers
2011 Copa Centroamericana players
2011 Copa América players
2017 Copa Centroamericana players
Puntarenas F.C. players
FK Senica players
A.D. Carmelita footballers
Municipal Pérez Zeledón footballers
C.F. Universidad de Costa Rica footballers
A.D. San Carlos footballers
Liga FPD players
Slovak Super Liga players
Expatriate footballers in Slovakia
Costa Rican expatriate sportspeople in Slovakia